347 Pariana (prov. designation:  or ) is a metallic background asteroid from the central region of the asteroid belt. It was discovered by French astronomer Auguste Charlois at the Nice Observatory on 28 November 1892. The origin of the asteroid's name remains unknown.

References

External links 
 
 

000347
Discoveries by Auguste Charlois
Named minor planets
000347
18921128